Polam (also Romanized as Polām; also known as Polām-e Bālā) is a village in Rahimabad Rural District, Rahimabad District, Rudsar County, Gilan Province, Iran. In 2006, its population was 341 in 85 families.

References 

Populated places in Rudsar County